Desmond Arthur Peter Leslie (29 June 1921, London – 21 February 2001, Antibes, France) was a British pilot, film maker, writer, and musician. He was the younger brother of Sir John Leslie, 4th Baronet, and youngest child, of Shane Leslie (a first cousin of Sir Winston Churchill), and his wife Marjorie (née Ide).

Biography
During his lifetime he served as a Spitfire pilot in the RAF during World War II, became one of the first pioneers of electronic music, and co-wrote one of the first books on UFOs, Flying Saucers Have Landed (1953), with writer and UFO contactee George Adamski.

In 1962, Leslie punched theatre critic Bernard Levin during a live broadcast of the TV show That Was The Week That Was. Ostensibly this was to protect the honour of his then-wife, Agnes Bernelle, in response to Levin's critical review of her show, Savagery and Delight. Bernelle stated in her autobiography, The Fun Palace, that  Savagery and Delight was poorly received due to Leslie's custom-built loudspeakers being moved below the stage, and that he had failed to check the situation, missing the show for a social appointment. As a consequence, no one behind the front two rows heard a word she sang.

Writer
Throughout his life, Desmond Leslie published several books, including the subject of UFOs—the first of which, Flying Saucers Have Landed, was co-written with George Adamski. He also wrote a series of satirical books ranging from The Jesus File, dealing with the crucifixion of Christ as recorded through the paper-work and internal correspondences of the Roman Garrison, to How Britain Won The Space Race, which he co-wrote with celebrated amateur astronomer Patrick Moore.

Screenwriting/directing career
Desmond Leslie was briefly a screenwriter/director for film and television.

 My Hands Are Clay (1947)
 Stranger at My Door (1950)
 Stranger from Venus (1954)
 Them in the Thing (1960)

Due to financial difficulties during the production of Stranger at My Door, Leslie opted to compose the music for the film himself. In the early 1950s, he designed the world's first effective multi-track sound mixing desk which he had built by Rupert Neve. It can still be seen in his family home Castle Leslie, Monaghan, where it has been an object of reverence for visitors such as Mick Jagger and Paul McCartney.

Electronic music career
During the late 1950s, he began nurturing his interest in contemporary music. In his small home studio, he experimented with the sounds of musique concrète. In January 1960, Leslie pressed a single acetate called Music of the Future. All Leslie recordings were later licensed to Joseph Weinburger, and Leslie's recordings were pressed onto a short series of 78rpm library discs, occasionally being put to use in science and mystery based programing, such as early Doctor Who episodes. He used a great number of tape sources to create his pieces; some sources he mentions in his liner notes are motor horns, humming tops and bells.

In 2005, Jonny Trunk's British record label, Trunk Records, re-released Desmond's 1960 acetate, never before released commercially. The sounds on this release were mastered from the original acetate. The recordings are believed to have been made between 1955 and 1959, and included are Desmond's original sleevenotes, containing information pertaining to each selection.

Marriages and children
His first wife was Agnes Elizabeth Bernauer (Agnes Bernelle) on 18 August 1945. That marriage ended in divorce. The couple had two sons and one daughter:

 Sir Shaun Rudolf Christopher Leslie, 5th Bt (b. 4 June 1947), married Charlotte Bing; no offspring. He will likely inherit the Leslie Baronetcy, of Glaslough, County Monaghan, that his uncle, John Leslie, held until his death in 2016. Sir Shaun is anticipated to be recognised as the 5th Baronet once he makes a formal application to be included on the Official Roll. As of 1 January 2022 the Baronetcy is regarded as 'Vacant'

 Christopher Mark Leslie (b. 7 December 1952), married Cliona Manahan and had two children.
 Antonia Kelvey Oriel Leslie (b. 1963), married Colm Nolan, and raised one daughter.

He remarried, to Jennifer Helen Strong, in 1970; they had two daughters:
 Samantha Helen Leslie (b. 1966)
 Camilla Patricia Leslie (b. 29 March 1969)

Last years and death
During the 1990s he devoted his time to restoring the aging family home of Castle Leslie which eventually opened to the public. He later relocated to Nice, France. He died from Emphysema in Antibes in 2001, aged 79.

References

Sources
 
 Desmond Leslie: The Biography of an Irish Gentleman 1921–2001; O'Bryne, Robert; Lilliput Press, Dublin 2012 
 The Flying Saucerers: A Social History of UFOlogy; Clarke, David and Roberts, Andy; Alternative Albion 2007 
 Desmond Leslie: Obituary; The Telegraph 20 March 2001

External links

 
 
 William1 website
 Find Articles
 Stylus Magazine

1921 births
2001 deaths
Deaths from emphysema
People from County Monaghan
Younger sons of baronets
Royal Air Force officers
British expatriates in France